Crossodactylodes (common name: bromeliad frogs) is a genus of leptodactylid frogs from the Atlantic Forest of eastern Brazil.

Most Crossodactylodes are Atlantic Forest species closely associated with bromeliads where they complete their entire life cycle, including the larval development. However, Crossodactylodes itambe inhabits rupicolous (rock-dwelling) bromeliads in open field habitats at higher altitudes.

Species
There are five species:
 Crossodactylodes bokermanni Peixoto, 1983
 Crossodactylodes itambe Barata, Santos, Leite, and Garcias, 2013
 Crossodactylodes izecksohni Peixoto, 1983
 Crossodactylodes pintoi Cochran, 1938
 Crossodactylodes septentrionalis Teixeira, Recoder, Amaro, Damasceno, Cassimiro, and Rodrigues, 2013

References

 
Leptodactylidae
Amphibians of South America
Amphibian genera
Taxa named by Doris Mable Cochran